HSZ may refer to:
 Hsinchu Air Base, an airbase in Hsinchu City, Taiwan
 Hydrate stability zone